This is the discography of the modern Nigerian world music artist King Sunny Adé, whose career has spanned more than forty years.

Discography

See also
 Juju Music

References

Discographies of Nigerian artists